Edward Henry Eiteljorge (October 14, 1871 – December 5, 1942) was a pitcher in Major League Baseball for parts of two seasons, one game with the Chicago Colts in , and eight games with the Washington Statesmen in .

He was the first of two individuals who have attended DePauw University to have become a major leaguer, along with Al Orth.  Eiteljorge died in Greencastle, Indiana, at the age of 71, and is interred at Forest Hill Cemetery.

References

External links

Major League Baseball pitchers
Chicago Colts players
Washington Statesmen players
Major League Baseball players from Germany
German emigrants to the United States
1871 births
1942 deaths
DePauw Tigers baseball players
19th-century baseball players
Sportspeople from Berlin
People from Greencastle, Indiana